Borussia Verein für Leibesübungen 1900 e. V. Mönchengladbach, commonly known as Borussia Mönchengladbach, Mönchengladbach or Gladbach (abbreviated as Borussia MG or BMG), is a professional football club based in Mönchengladbach, North Rhine-Westphalia, Germany that plays in the Bundesliga, the top flight of German football. Nicknamed Die Fohlen  (The Foals), the club has won five league titles, three DFB-Pokals and two UEFA Europa League titles.

Borussia Mönchengladbach were founded in 1900, with their name derived from a Latinised form of Prussia, which was a popular name for German clubs in the former Kingdom of Prussia. The team joined the Bundesliga in 1965 and saw the majority of its success in the 1970s, where, under the guidance of Hennes Weisweiler and then Udo Lattek, a young squad with a fast, aggressive playing style was formed. During this period, Mönchengladbach won the Bundesliga five times, the UEFA Cup twice and reached a European Cup final in 1977.

Since 2004, Borussia Mönchengladbach have played at Borussia-Park, having previously played at the Bökelbergstadion since 1919. Based on membership, they are the fifth-largest club in Germany with over 75,000 members in 2016 and 93,000 as of 2021. The club's main rivals are 1. FC Köln, against whom they contest the Rheinland Derby. Their secondary rivals include Borussia Dortmund, Fortuna Düsseldorf, and Bayer Leverkusen.

History

1899–1905: Formation
In November 1899, a group of discontented members left their sports association, TC Germania Gladbach (referred to as "Teutonia Gladbach" in some sources). On 17 November 1899, thirteen of these young men formed a new club, this time specifically focused on association football, in the Zum Jägerhof pub. They chose the word Borussia (Latin: "Prussia") as their association's new title, although this was not yet the club's official founding. Borussia was chosen because Mönchengladbach was located in the western provinces awarded to the Kingdom of Prussia as part of the 1815 Congress of Vienna. Other notable football clubs in western Germany that chose the name "Prussia" as their title include Borussia Dortmund in 1909 and SC Preußen Münster in 1906.Borussia's early years were faced with the problems typical for association football teams in the German Empire: the sport, only recently imported from the UK in the 1880s, was not yet institutionally accepted, and as a result there were logistical shortages of football fields, goals, changing rooms, and player equipment. Borussia's players initially were stuck having to finance their own gear for what was at the time a considerable financial expenditure for working-class people.

Borussia was the second dedicated football club in the city of Mönchengladbach. FC Mönchengladbach, founded six years earlier in 1894, quickly became Borussia's first rival. Whereas FC Mönchengladbach was decently established, young Borussia found it difficult to guarantee regular access to training grounds and equipment. As a result, the team joined the Marianische Jünglings-Kongregation Mönchengladbach Eicken (German: "Marian Youth Congregation Mönchengladbach Eicken"), a fairly conservative Catholic sporting association. Within this larger organization, the footballers reformed into the Fussball Club Borussia 1900 on 1 August 1900, marking the club's official founding date.

From within the congregation, Borussia was able to more effectively organize official games against various opposing teams. The team scored 2–1 victories over both Blitz Neuwerk and Germania Mönchengladbach and a 4–2 victory over Rheydt FC. As early as 1902, Borussia crossed international borders for the first time, losing 0–2 against Helmondia Helmond in the Netherlands before playing the Dutch team to a 1–1 draw at home.

The appeal of both association football in general and Borussia in particular proved too socially scandalous for the conservative federation leadership to tolerate. The practice of football players wearing shorts instead of long trousers and the reality of football practice on Sundays hindering Church attendance created tension between Borussia and the Youth Congregation Eicken, and Borussia ultimately left the congregation on 24 May 1903.

To continue successful football competitions and to ease the organization of games, the club had applied to join the Rheinisch-Westfälischer Spielverband (German: "Rhenish-Westphalian Sports Federation") on 16 February 1903, and was accepted on 23 February. Borussia continued playing local and regional opponents like Britannia Düsseldorf and BV Solingen. They also continued to travel to the nearby Netherlands, drawing Eindhoven VV 1–1. Still, the team at times struggled against mightier opponents. Borussia received a 0–11 thrashing at the hands of Borussia Cologne in October 1903 in the away fixture, before somewhat improving the performance by losing 1–4 at home in the return game.

In 1904, Borussia competed with several other local teams in the third class of the second district of the Rhenish-Westphalian Sports Federation. After Borussia's only competitor for the title, BV Solingen, skipped the 1905 fixture in Mönchengladbach, Borussia won the title without having to face their opponent. On 8 January 1905, Borussia additionally scored a respectable 1–0 win over its city rival FC Mönchengladbach, albeit only against the third team, confirming an earlier 6–1 win over FC Mönchengladbach on 26 December 1904. After having won the district cup, Borussia competed for the third class federation cup against, among others, teams from Essen and Cologne, ultimately losing the title to Kölner FC 99.

1905–1914: Before World War I
After some decent athletic success in the year 1905 (18 games, 12 wins, 1 draw, 5 losses), Borussia nonetheless faced frustration, as the playing grounds were judged insufficient for competition play. The team was subsequently excluded from major competitions until a more appropriate locale could be found.

Ultimately, Borussia acquired a patch of land on Reyerhütterstraße in Mönchengladbach to enable organized play, at a time when the growing spread of football made it more and more of a hassle in terms of property damage and noise pollution. By achieving access to its own football grounds, Borussia thus evaded the growing number of police actions that were launched to call football enthusiasts to order. Regular play continued, after more than a year of absence, in the second class of the second district, against teams like FC Mönchengladbach II, FC Eintracht Mönchengladbach and various teams from Düsseldorf and Krefeld, among others. After a 2–0 against Rheydt and two victories over Düsseldorf teams (4–1 against Britannia Düsseldorf, 4–1 against Union Düsseldorf), the first home game was held in Reyerhütterstraße against Preußen Krefeld. Borussia won the game with two goals difference.

At the end of the competition, Borussia was crowned district champions with eight wins in eight games (although Borussia had lost a 0–2 game against FC Mönchengladbach II that was subsequently annulled when FC Mönchengladbach II was disqualified from the competition), with 25 goals scored and only 8 conceded. But Borussia was skipped for promotion regardless; the club was once again assigned to the second class (now called B-Klasse) as result of a league reform.

In 1907, Borussia left Reyerhütterstraße, where a new factory was under construction, and reached a deal with Gladbacher Turnverein 1848 to cooperatively run a ground near the Schweizerhaus, a famous gastronomy in the vicinity of the Kaiser-Friedrich-Halle [de]. Games at the new grounds go well, with a 5–1 win over Borussia Köln, which had inflicted a painful 0–11 loss on Borussia in 1903, as well as a 5–3 against Rheydt. The season as a whole was mediocre for Borussia, ending with five wins, four losses and a draw at 19 goals scored and 13 conceded in third place. Borussia was qualified for a promotion tournament to determine the team to be promoted to A class, but lost 0–6 to Viktoria Mönchengladbach.

The 1908–09 season was better for Borussia. After a 0–2 loss at home against FC Eintracht Mönchengladbach, Borussia regained its footing, beating Viktoria Mönchengladbach 4–1 in an away game and drawing them 2–2 at home. On 13 January 1909, Borussia scored an overwhelming 13–1 victory over Spiel und Sport Essen. Losing no game but the opener against Eintracht, Gladbach easily came first in the league and was thus qualified from Group South to face the promotion candidates from Group North, FC Cleve 06. After a resounding 5–1 win at home, the enthusiasm was dampened by a 3–4 setback in the away fixture. In the tiebreaker game, Borussia won 4–1, at last gaining promotion to the first division.

Going into the 1909–10 season, Borussia exchanged its previous black and white color scheme with blue and yellow vertical stripes. Gladbach started into the higher league with significant issues, bringing Rheydt SpV only to a 2–2 at home before struggling with a crushing defeat in the 0–9 away fixture. The team ended the season with five wins, five losses and two draws in fourth place, dodging relegation. The club's tenth anniversary had seen a record 143 registered members, up from 32 in 1906 and 75 in 1908.

In the 1910–11 season, the league grew from seven to ten teams, adding opponents like Germania Hilden, FC Krefeld and Eintracht Mönchengladbach, bringing the game plan for Borussia to 18 games, not counting numerous friendly matches that brought the total number of games played to over 30, placing a significant strain on the amateur players. Aside from a noteworthy 11–2 victory over rivals Rheydt SV, the season was another mediocre performance for Borussia. The season forced Borussia to once again move the playing ground, after the Schweizerhaus grounds were deemed to dangerous in response to complaints by opposing teams. Borussia subsequently moved to grounds near the Catholic graveyard, and finished fourth in the league. The new grounds was known as Stadion am Rosengarten.

The 1911–12 season was the first major success in the club's history. Borussia easily dominated the league with twelve wins, one draw and one loss, and thus earned qualification for promotion games towards Verbandsliga as northern district champions as well as the West German championship. Borussia defeated VfJuB Düren, the southern district champions, in a 4–2 game, before achieving a 5–0 blowout against VfB 1900 Gießen, the Hessian champions. Ultimately, Borussia lost the finals for the West German championship against Cologne BC 01, the precursor of Borussia's greatest all-time rival, 1. FC Köln, at a 2–4 scoreline.

In a step down from the previous season's outstanding performance, Borussia proved to struggle in the 1912–13 season. While the team was not threatened by relegation at any point in the tournament, Borussia ended in the middle of the table without a serious claim towards the title, and was no serious threat in the West German championship either. Borussia ended the season in sixth place in the league, at eight wins, two draws and eight losses.

In the last full season before World War I, the German footballing structure was again reformed in the 1913–14 season. The system of two federation leagues (German: Verbandsliga) of twenty clubs each was replaced with a system of four district leagues (German: Kreisliga) of ten clubs each. This left Borussia in the Rhenish Northern District (German: Rheinischer Nordkreis) along with teams from Aachen and Düsseldorf, as well as other teams from Mönchengladbach. In the preparation for the season, Borussia performed miserably, losing 1–3 to Viktoria Duisburg and 1–6 to Duisburg SV. Borussia nonetheless entered the season with the clear goal to earn the district championship. The team fell well short of that target, coming third in the league at five wins, five draws and four losses. The highlight of the season is a friendly match against an English professional team. Dulwich Hamlet F.C., which Borussia's amateur footballers lost 2–5 (initially having led 2–1 by the 80th minute before conceding four goals in the last ten minutes).

1914–1918: World War I
In March 1914, the club purchased De Kull, a decommissioned gravel pit and the grounds on which the later Bökelbergstadion would be built. The First World War halted the progress of both the stadium and football in general, as many players volunteered or were drafted for military service. With rapidly changing player lineups, Borussia contested the war cup (German: Kriegspokal), beating Düren 7–0. In total, Borussia played 18 games in the 1914–15 season, in spite of the logistical difficulties caused by the war.

In time for the 1915–16 season, it had become clear that the war, initially anticipated by all sides to conclude quickly, would last longer than expected. Regardless, Borussia was able to assemble a functional team for the season (reinforced regularly by players on vacation from frontline duty), and played games against Union Krefeld, Viktoria Rheydt, Konstantia Kaldenkirchen, VfB Krefeld, FC Mönchengladbach and Eintracht Mönchengladbach. After a shaky start including a 1–4 friendly game loss to Borussia Düsseldorf, Borussia found its footing in the league, and briefly rivalled Krefeld for the first place in January 1916. Ultimately, Borussia finished second in the league. By mid-1916, Borussia was forced to cease regular play due to the lack of regularly available players. By 4 November 1916, even the provisional club leadership had to cease operations, as too many of its members were called up for military service.

Borussia suffered several losses due to war casualties: The club's chairman since 1912, Heinz Körstgens, was killed in action in 1915, as was Stephan Ditgens, Borussia player and uncle of Borussia's first ever Germany national team player, Heinz Ditgens.

1918–1933: During the Weimar Republic 
In the immediate aftermath of the military armistice of 11 November 1918, football clubs all over Germany began to gradually resume operations. Members of Borussia had informal meetings about the resumption of play even during the last months of the war, as early as mid-1918. The first recorded game of this phase was a 5–0 over Rheydt SV on 15 August 1918, followed by the turnaround in the form of a 2–7 thrashing at the hands of Rheydt SV in the return fixture a week later. The aftermath of the war interrupted the blossoming football of 1918–19, as only seven of Borussia's 14 planned games were held due to the occupation of the region by the Belgian Armed Forces.

The decades-long struggle to find a usable locale to play continued, as De Kull was not yet ready to be used. By early 1919, the team returned to Schweizerhaus as a temporary measure. On 15 March 1919, FC Borussia merged with another local club, Turnverein Germania 1889, becoming 1889 VfTuR M.Gladbach. The club achieved its first major success in 1920, defeating Kölner BC 3–1 to win the 1920–1921 West German championship final.

The union between Germania and Borussia only lasted a matter of two years; the club was thereafter known as Borussia VfL 1900 e.V. M.Gladbach.

1933–1945: Football under the Third Reich
Following the rise of the Nazi Party to power in 1933, the German league system was reformed to consist of 16 Gauligen – Gladbach found themselves playing first in the Gauliga Niederrhein, and later in various Bezirksklassen (district leagues). Also while under the Third Reich, Mönchengladbach's first ever international player was capped; Heinz Ditgens playing in a 9–0 win over Luxembourg for Germany in the 1936 Olympic Games.

1945–1959: Rebuild after War

Eventually, Mönchengladbach resumed play in June 1946, gaining successive promotions to the Landesliga Niederrhein (the regional second tier) in 1949 and the top flight, the Oberliga West, in 1950. Following many years of promotions and relegations, Borussia won their first Oberliga title in the 1958–59 season.

1959–1965: Promotion to the Bundesliga

In August 1960, Borussia Mönchengladbach defeated 1. FC Köln in the West German Cup. Weeks later, the club won the DFB-Pokal, clinching their first national honours after defeating Karlsruher SC 3–2 in the final. Borussia therefore qualified for the European Cup Winners' Cup in 1960–61, where they were defeated 11–0 on aggregate by the Scottish club, Rangers.  Rangers won 3–0 in Germany and 8–0 in Glasgow.

The following year, the club took on the now-familiar name Borussia VfL Mönchengladbach after the city of München-Gladbach became Mönchengladbach.

The 1961–62 season in the Oberliga ended again with Borussia in 13th place in the table. In 1962–63, the club hoped in vain to join the circle of DFB clubs which would start next year in the newly founded Bundesliga. Helmut Beyer, who remained in office for 30 years, took over the responsibility of president that season and Helmut Grashoff took over as second chairman. In July 1962, Borussia signed Fritz Langner, who had won the West German championship in 1959 with Westfalia Herne, as their new coach. To Langner's chagrin, the new leadership sold Albert Brüllsfor a record fee of 250,000 DM to FC Modena in Italy in order to rehabilitate the club financially. Helmut Grashoff, who collected the fee in Italian lira in cash in a suitcase, later said he had feared, after the money transfer, "being thought a bank robber". The proceeds from the transfer enabled Langner to rebuild the squad with the signing of players like Heinz Lowin, Heinz Crawatzo and Siegfried Burkhardt. That year, the A-Youth team won the West German championship with a squad that included future professional footballers, Jupp Heynckes and Herbert Laumen.

Further honours would have to wait a decade. Borussia's results in the ten years leading up to the formation of the Bundesliga in 1963 were not strong enough to earn them admission into the ranks of the nation's new top flight professional league, and so the club played in the second tier, the Regionalliga West.

In the next season, 1964–65, the club signed the youngsters, Jupp Heynckes and Bernd Rupp, and some of the youth team joined the professional squad. Their average age of 21.5 years was the lowest of all regional league teams. They earned the nickname "foals" due to their low average age as well as their carefree and successful play. Reporter Wilhelm August Hurtmanns coined the nickname in his articles in the Rheinische Post. He was taken with the style of Borussia and wrote that they would play like young foals. By April 1965, the team had won the Regionalliga West and thus secured the participation in the Bundesliga promotion round in Group 1. This saw the team play against the competitors of Wormatia Worms (Second in the Regionalliga Südwest), SSV Reutlingen (Second in the Regionalliga Süd) and Holstein Kiel (Champions in the Regionalliga Nord) in first and second matches. Of the six games Borussia won three (5–1 in Worms, 1–0 against Kiel and 7–0 against Reutlingen). The achievement of the first place made promotion to the Bundesliga safe. Together with Borussia Bayern Munich rose by winning Group 2.

Mönchengladbach enjoyed its first taste of the Bundesliga in the 1965–66 season, earning promotion alongside future powerhouse Bayern Munich. The two clubs would go on to engage in a fierce struggle as they challenged each other for domestic supremacy throughout the 1970s. Bayern took first blood in the struggle for supremacy between the two: winning the Bundesliga championship in 1969. Mönchengladbach struck back immediately in the next season with a championship of their own and followed up with a second title in 1971, becoming the first Bundesliga club ever to successfully defend their title.

1965–1969: Early years in Bundesliga and struggles

The commitment of Weisweiler as coach pointed the way for the sporting success of the club in the Bundesliga. The economic situation of the club did not allow to finance a team of stars. Weisweiler corresponded to the needs of the association with his attitude to promote the education and development of young talents. He pressed Players not in a fixed game system, but promoted individualism and gave them considerable freedom on the field. This resulted in a carefree and offensive style of playing, the hallmark of Fohlenelf.

The club signed with Berti Vogts and Heinz Wittmann, both players whose names should be closely linked to the sporting successes of Borussia.

The first Bundesliga match in the 1965–66 season took place away against Borussia Neunkirchen and ended 1–1, the first Bundesliga goal scorer was Gerhard Elfert. The first home game against SC Tasmania 1900 Berlin Borussia won 5–0. Weisweiler knew how to give the team tactical freedom and to promote the individual enthusiasm of the players. These freedoms cost the still immature team in the first Bundesliga season with a number of sometimes high defeats. The Borussia finished the first season in the Bundesliga on the 13th place in the table.

In the following season 1966–67 showed the scoring power of the Mönchengladbacher team, which scored 70 goals. The striker Herbert Laumen scored 18, Bernd Rupp 16 and Jupp Heynckes scored 14 goals. Due to the good goal difference, the team was able to complete the season on the eighth place in the table. With an 11–0 home win over FC Schalke 04 on Matchday 18, the team celebrated the first highest ever victory in Bundesliga history.

The successes had the side effect that the salaries of the players jumped up and thus good players were not easy to hold onto. Jupp Heynckes moved for the former record transfer fee of 275,000 DM to Hannover 96, Bernd Rupp moved to SV Werder Bremen, and Eintracht Braunschweig signed Gerhard Elfert. The club bought Peter Meyer and Peter Dietrich and thus compensated for the departure of seasoned players. With a 10–0 win on the twelfth match-day of the season 1967–68 over Borussia Neunkirchen, the team showed again their scoring power. The team reached in this and the next season third place in the table. The club signed in the season 1968–69 their future coach Horst Köppel, who had already had first experiences in the national team, and from hitherto unknown amateur VfL Schwerte the then long-time goalkeeper Wolfgang Kleff and Hartwig Bleidick, Gerd Zimmermann and Winfried Schäfer, who played ten seasons at Borussia.

1970–1980: Golden decade: Dominance in the league and successes in Europe

The 1970s went down as the most successful in the club's history. 

Under coach Hennes Weisweiler, the young side displayed an offensive-minded philosophy and powerful play that attracted fans from all over Germany.
Borussia won the championship five times, more than any other team in this time. At the same time a rivalry developed with FC Bayern Munich, with which Borussia together ascended in 1965 to the Bundesliga.

After the club had twice finished in previous years third place in the table, coached Hennes Weisweiler in the 1969–70 season especially the defence. Deviating from the "foal" concept, Borussia bought for the first time experienced defensive players like Luggi Müller and Klaus-Dieter Sieloff. With Ulrik le Fevre the club signed their first Danish player, later followed by Henning Jensen and Allan Simonsen. This season saw the first Bundesliga victory over Bayern. After a 5–1 win over Alemannia Aachen on 31 October 1969, Borussia topped the Bundesliga for the first time. Today (as of December 2018) Borussia takes third place in the list of league leaders in the Bundesliga behind Bayern and Dortmund.

With a home win against Hamburger SV on 30 April 1970, the 33rd Round of the season, Borussia were named as champions.

On 16 September 1970 Herbert Laumen scored in the 6–0 win against EPA Larnaka the first goal for Borussia in a game of European club football. The first round of the following season 1970–71 saw the club having only one defeat. In the history of the Bundesliga unique is an incident in the home game of the 27th matchday against Werder Bremen, known as the post break from Bökelberg. In the game on 3 April 1971, after a penalty area scene in the 88th minute, the striker Herbert Laumen after a head clash together with the Bremen goalkeeper Günter Bernardinto overturned the left goal post. After unsuccessful attempts at repair and no replacement goal could be set up, the referee stopped the game at the score of 1:1. The DFB sports court in Frankfurt rated the game as a 2–0 win for Bremen. As a consequence, the DFB obliged the clubs to provide a replacement for both goals. The championship was decided only on the last match day as a head-to-head race with Bayern Munich. Nine weeks after the post-break game, on 5 June 1971, Borussia were the first side in the history of the Bundesliga to defend their championship title, with a victory at Eintracht Frankfurt.

On 20 October 1971 in the European Cup, the champions took part in a can-throwing game in football history match against Inter Milan instead. Borussia won the match at Bökelbergstadion 7–1, but UEFA cancelled the game, as the Italian striker Roberto Boninsegna was hit by an empty coke can and received medical treatment. coaching legend Matt Busby described the game of the colts :

After a 4–2 away defeat in Milan and a goalless draw in the replay at the Berlin Olympic Stadium, Borussia were eliminated from the Cup of the national champions.

Die Fohlen were able to take some consolation in a 2–1 victory over 1. FC Köln in the Rheinland derby by a goal by Günter Netzer in 1973 to win their second DFB-Pokal. For Netzer this was the last game for Borussia: he left the club and moved to Real Madrid.

In addition to the game-winning scene in the 93rd minute from Netzer there were numerous other highlights in the 30th cup final in history, that of the one best, playful highly interesting and exciting in the history of this competition in the annals entered and of which one could swarm only in highest tones ( Kicker ).

The first international final match took place on 9 May 1973. Liverpool won the UEFA Cup first-leg 3–0 on the second try after the game was cancelled the day before due to rain. On 23 May 1973 Borussia Mönchengladbach won the second-leg 2–0, but Liverpool won the cup by aggregate victory.

The following seasons were marked by the departure of well-known players, although the main Mönchengladbach striker remained. In the 1973–74 season Jupp Heynckes' 30 goals made him the top-scorer in the Bundesliga, the first Borussia Monchengladbach player to be so. In that first season following the departure of Günter Netzer, Borussia finished as runner-up to champions Bayern Munich by one point. With a total of 93 goals scored Borussia set a new club record. Borussia graduated in the following years 1972 to 1974, the championship in third and fifth place and vice-champion.

In the 1974–75 season Borussia laid the foundation for a feat previously unheard of in the Bundesliga. On Matchday 17, the "foals" topped the league table and did not relinquish the league lead until winning the championship on 14 June 1975. The joy over the title was clouded by the departure of coach Hennes Weisweiler, who left the club after eleven years in the direction of FC Barcelona. The next international final with Mönchengladbach participation took place on 7 May 1975. The first leg of the UEFA Cup in Düsseldorf between Borussia and Twente Enschede ended goalless. The second leg on 21 May 1975 was won by the VfL 5: 1. With the highest away win in a UEFA Cup final, Borussia won their first international title.

Udo Lattek, who came from the rival Bayern Munich, although he had already signed with Rot-Weiss Essen, took over the club in the 1975–76 season. In contrast to the departed Weisweiler, Lattek represented a rather safety-first philosophy. The team topped the Championship on the twelfth round of the season, with a victory over Werder Bremen and Eintracht Braunschweig, and retained that lead to the end of the season.

On 3 March 1976, on Ash Wednesday, was the next sensational international appearance of Borussia. In the European Champions Cup, Borussia Mönchengladbach played against Real Madrid, where now Günter Netzer and Paul Breitner were under contract, 2: 2. In the second leg (17 March 1976), which ended 1–1, the referee Leonardus van der Kroft did not recognise two Mönchengladbach goals, in the 68th minute a goal by Henning Jensen and in the 83rd minute by Hans-Jürgen Wittkamp. Once a foul must have preceded the goal, once the referee decided on offside, although it had been not indicated by the linesman. The draw was enough for the Madrilenians to progress.

The team stayed on the attack, and matched Bayern's achievement, with three consecutive titles from 1975 to 1977. On 12 June 1976 Mönchengladbach won a fourth league title.

In the 1976–77 season Lattek went with an almost unchanged team at the start. As Wolfgang Kleff was injured, the club signed a new goalkeeper. In Wolfgang Kneib, who came from SV Wiesbaden, Lattek found a safe substitute. Borussia needed one point to defend the title on the final day. The match took place away against Bayern Munich, then sixth in the table, and ended 2:2 by an own goal in the 90th minute by Hans-Jürgen Wittkamp. Borussia made the hat-trick and won on 21 May 1977 for the third time in a row and for the fifth time overall the German championship title. The Dane Allan Simonsen received after this season the award as Europe's Footballer of the Year with the Ballon d'Or.

The team narrowly missed a fourth championship title in a row in season 1977–78: Monchengladbach lost out to 1. FC Köln only by a worse goal difference. Borussia won against Borussia Dortmund 12–0 on the final day of the season, still the highest victory in the history of the Bundesliga. However, the Domstädter won their last game 5:0 at FC St. Pauli: they had a better goal difference by three goals and so won the championship. For the first time in the Bundesliga first and second were tied after the end of the season. Borussia would have been able to decide the championship in their favour had they won the match against 1. FC Cologne a few weeks earlier. However, the game ended in a draw, with Cologne player Heinz Flohe netting a vital 83rd-minute equaliser.

Although Mönchengladbach lost the 1977 final of the European Cup to Liverpool in Rome(25 May 1977), they also made four appearances in the UEFA Cup with wins in 1975 and 1979 against losses in 1973 and 1980. The club's spectacular run had come to an end with eight trophies to their credit, and although they would continue to be competitive for many years, success would be much harder to come by.

In the following season 1978–79 Udo Lattek managed Borussia for the last time. Many regulars left the club, such as the later vice-president Rainer Bonhof, or announced their career end, such as Jupp Heynckes and Berti Vogts. Lattek did not succeed in offsetting these departures with appropriate new signings. On Matchday 30, the team was in 15th place with a goal-difference of 38:47 goals: three wins from the last four games improved the finish to tenth place. It was the first season in a long time in which the club finished with a negative goal-difference. Borussia signed Jupp Heynckes to be assistant coach to Lattek this season. The second international title started on 9 May 1979. The first leg in the UEFA Cup against Red Star Belgrade ended in a draw. In the second leg on 23 May 1979 Borussia won 1–0 at home to win the UEFA Cup for the second time.

After the departure of Lattek in the 1979–80 season, the club appointed Jupp Heynckes head coach. The season was marked by two new entries. The club signed Harald Nickel of Eintracht Braunschweig. With a transfer fee of 1.15 million DM this was the hitherto most expensive new purchase. From Herzogenaurach came Lothar Matthäus. Borussia finished the season in seventh place. On 7 May 1980 Borussia Mönchengladbach was again in a final for the UEFA Cup. At home, the team won against Eintracht Frankfurt 3–2. In the second leg on 21 May 1980 Eintracht Frankfurt won 1–0 against Borussia Mönchengladbach and secured the trophy due to the larger number of away goals scored.

1980–1996: Slow down

In the 1980s, Borussia could no longer build on the titles of the past decade and fell behind of the former rival from Munich. Due to the lack of ticket revenue from the small Bökelbergstadion the club had to sell top performers again and again. Nevertheless, it was possible to settle frequently in the upper third of the Bundesliga and play in the championship fight. In the 1980–81 season many longtime players and performers left the club, including Karl Del'Haye who is considered the first player who was signed by FC Bayern Munich in hostile intent. Borussia committed with Wolfram Wuttke only to striking players. They replaced Wolfgang Kleff in goal to Uli Sude. The team reached this season's sixth place in the table. The sporting record did not improve in the following two seasons. With a seventh place in 1982 Borussia missed the participation in the international competitions. The following year, Uwe Kamps guarded the goal for the first time, and remained long-time goalkeeper for many years.

In the 1983–84 season Borussia played for the title. With Bernd Krauss, Michael Frontzeck and Uli Borowka Borussia committed players who played for a long time successfully for the club. At the end they landed tied behind VfB Stuttgart and Hamburger SV in third place. It was the first time in the history of the Bundesliga that three clubs tied the table on the last matchday. In the same season, Mönchengladbach also lost the DFB-Pokal final to Bayern Munich on penalties, Lothar Matthäus and Norbert Ringels both missing from the spot after the game originally ended all square at 1–1. Matthäus subsequently joined Bayern Munich for a then-record fee of 2.25 million DM, leading some fans to question whether he had deliberately missed his penalty.

In the 1984–85 season Borussia won 10–0 on Matchday 8 against Eintracht Braunschweig which is so far the last two-digit victory in Bundesliga history. In the semi-finals of the German Cup VfL met again at Bayern Munich. After no goals had been scored in the regular season in Munich's Olympiastadion, Søren Lerby converted a penalty kick against Borussia goalkeeper Ulrich Sude in the 101st minute. This remained the only goal of the evening, so that Borussia missed the entry into the final.

The season 1985–86 brought no sporting highlights in the Bundesliga with the club finishing fourth. Borussia Mönchengladbach gave away a 5–1 win over Real Madrid on 27 November 1985 in Düsseldorf (11 December 1985) when the club lost 4–0 in Madrid and dropped out of the UEFA Cup.

In the 1986–87 season was again a coach change. Jupp Heynckes announced his move to Bayern Munich. The club nominated Wolf Werner as the new coach. At the end of the season Borussia stood with the third place in the table for the last time in this decade at a UEFA Cup place. The Association of German Sports Journalists voted Uwe Rahn Player of the Year. Again Borussia reached the semi-finals of the DFB Cup. But also this time Borussia lost against the later DFB Cup winner Hamburger SV. On 22 April 1987, Borussia lost against the Scottish representative Dundee United after defeat at home in Bökelberg in the UEFA Cup semi-final. It was also the first defeat in a European Cup game on the Bökelberg. After the departure of Jupp Heynckes, the era of long-standing engagements of head coaches ended. In the first 23 years from 1964 to 1987 Borussia only had three instructors; Since the departure of Heynckes, Borussia had committed 16 new coaches until 2008, with the exception of interim solutions. It was Werner's release on 21 November 1989 that saw first premature dismissal of a coach at Borussia at all. Only three later coaches managed to succeed in Mönchengladbach for more than three years, Bernd Krauss (1992–1996), Hans Meyer (1999–2003) and Lucien Favre (2011–2015).

In the next season Borussia signed Stefan Effenberg, a player who worked long and successfully for the club. Borussia finished the season in seventh place and thus missed the participation in international competitions. The early 1990s followed a significant downward trend. As a result of the sporting decline, the number of spectators at the Bökelberg was declining for the first time. Already in the season 1989–90 the club played against relegation. In the following years Borussia placed in the midfield of the league. In the 1991–92 season Borussia played again a good cup season. In the Cup semi-final goalkeeper Uwe Kamps held on penalties all four penalties of the players of Bayer 04 Leverkusen. Borussia reached the final. The final on 23 May 1992 saw the Mönchengladbachers lose against the club from second division Hannover 96 3:4 on penalties.

In 1993, the club signed the players Heiko Herrlich and Patrik Andersson, and in 1994, Stefan Effenberg came back, who played for Borussia Mönchengladbach from 1987 to 1990. Under coach Bernd Krauss, they managed a renewed connection to the Bundesliga top end. In the 1994–95 season came the first trophy for Borussia since 1979, where they won the DFB-Pokal with a 3–0 victory over VfL Wolfsburg. Borussia would also win the Supercup against the German champions Borussia Dortmund a few months later.

1996–2010: Firm decline and new stadium

The team's performance slipped significantly in the 1990s and Die Fohlen soon found themselves struggling in the lower half of the Bundesliga table.

After the first round of the 1996–97 season, Borussia finished 17th place in the table. The club dismissed coach Krauss due to the sporting failure. At the end of the season, the Mönchengladbacher were in 11th place. None of the other four coaches to Krauss remained in office for more than a year. Under Friedel Rausch could Borussia only hold the bundesliga position after a dramatic season finale in 1998. Before the last matchday, the Borussia were three points behind a relegation zone. On the final day of the season succeeded a 2–0 away win at VfL Wolfsburg; Karlsruher SC lost to Hansa Rostock and went down due to the worse goal difference.

In the international arena, the season was disappointing despite two victories in the first round of the UEFA Cup against Arsenal. Borussia lost in the second round of the first leg 2–4 against AS Monaco, the most recent victory Borussia reached with a 1–0 in Monaco, but were eliminated from the competition. In the season 1998–99 Borussia won 3–0 against FC Schalke 04 on Matchday 1 and was at the top of the table for the first time in 13 years. As a result, the team lost six matches and drew two draws, so they stood on the ninth day at the bottom of the table. On the tenth and eleventh round followed by a 2:8 defeat against Bayer 04 Leverkusen and a 1:7 at Vfl Wolfsburg two high defeats in a row. The team remained until the end of the season in 18th place. After a total of 21 lost games, the consequence was the first descent from the Bundesliga. As a consequence of the descent, several top performers, including goalkeeper Robert Enke, defender Patrik Andersson and midfielder Karlheinz Pflipsen and Sebastian Deisler all left the club.

Finally, in 1999, Gladbach were relegated to 2. Bundesliga, where they would spend two seasons. Upon returning to the Bundesliga in 2001, Mönchengladbach remained uninspired as they continued to be mired in the bottom half of the league.

The first season in the 2nd Bundesliga started the same way as the previous one ended. In the DFB Cup, the team were knocked out early after a lost penalty shootout against the regional league SC Verl. The second division season 1999–2000 ended the Borussia despite bad first round still on the fifth place in the table. Four points were missing for direct promotion.

On 1 August 2000, Borussia Mönchengladbach celebrated the 100-year anniversary of the club. As part of the celebrations, next to coach Hennes Weisweiler the following players were elected by Borussia supporters in the so-called century Elf: As goalkeeper Wolfgang Kleff, in defence Berti Vogts, Hans-Günter Bruns, Wilfried Hannes and Patrik Andersson, in midfield Rainer Bonhof, Stefan Effenberg, Herbert Wimmer and Günter Netzer and in attack Jupp Heynckes and Allan Simonsen. Later, large-format posters with images of the players on the north and east sides were attached to the steel exterior of the stadium in Borussia Park.

In the 2000–01 season, the team was able to celebrate as a runner-up in the Bundesliga 2 re-emergence in the Bundesliga and reached the semi-finals of the DFB Cup, but were knocked out as in the previous year against a Regionalligisten ( 1 FC Union Berlin ) on penalties. Borussia won first place in the national fair play ranking in 2002 in the draw for a place in the UEFA Cup, but the lot was not drawn. Also in the season 2003–04 Borussia missed participation in the UEFA Cup. On 17 March 2004, the Borussia were eliminated by a 0–1 defeat against the then second division Alemannia Aachen in the semi-finals of the DFB Cup. A victory against the Alemannia would have been enough, because the final opponent Werder Bremen was already qualified for the UEFA Champions League due to the table position. The season was under the motto Bye Bye Bökelberg, because on 22 May 2004, the last Bundesliga match took place in Bökelbergstadion. The Borussia defeated TSV 1860 Munich 3:1; the last goal on Bökelberg was headed by Arie van Lent. Uwe Kamps came on in the 82nd minute and came to his 457th match in the Bundesliga.

In 2004, Mönchengladbach appointed Dick Advocaat, who had guided the Netherlands national team to the semi-finals of UEFA Euro 2004 and was a successful manager at Rangers, as their new coach. However, Advocaat was unable to turn the team's fortunes and resigned in April of the following year. Former Mönchengladbach player and German international Horst Köppel was appointed caretaker for the remaining five fixtures of the season. Köppel had managed the club's reserves since leaving Borussia Dortmund in June 2004. For the 2006–07 season, legendary Mönchengladbach player and coach Jupp Heynckes was appointed as team coach.

Borussia had taken steps to improve their financial situation with the construction of a new state-of-the-art stadium called Borussia-Park with a permitted capacity of 59,771 spectators (limited to 54,067 for Bundesliga games and to 46,249 for international games). The club had long been hindered by playing in a much smaller and older facility (Bökelberg, capacity 34,500) and with the opening of the new stadium in 2004 can look forward to increased revenues through higher ticket sales and the ability to host lucrative international matches.

On the 31st matchday of the 2006–07 season, Borussia Mönchengladbach were relegated from the Bundesliga after fellow relegation fighters Arminia Bielefeld upset Werder Bremen 3–2 while Mönchengladbach lost 1–0 at home to VfB Stuttgart. They were promoted back to the Bundesliga on the 32nd match-day of the 2007–08 season after winning the match against SV Wehen 3–0.

2010–2017: Revival

For the 110th anniversary of the club, the club brought out a DVD on which the club's story is told in a 110-minute film. On 28 July 2010 it was premiered in a cinema in Mönchengladbach.

In the DFB Cup 2010–11 for the first time after five years the round of 16 was reached. In the Bundesliga they succeeded after 16 years in getting the first victory against Bayer 04 Leverkusen, but at the end of the preliminary round, the club were in last place.

Due to the seasonally poor athletic performance, a merger of leaders from the local economy founded the initiative Borussia, which accused the club management of mismanagement. According to the initiative, the old, encrusted structures should be dissolved in order to give Borussia a future. So the money should be invested in the sport rather than in the planned museum complex with attached hotel. At the 2011 Annual General Meeting, only 335 of the 4769 members present voted in favour of the initiative's goals.

At the Bundesliga home game against 1. FSV Mainz 05, Marco Reus scored the 2500th Bundesliga goal in the 1445th game. Other Jubiläumstorschützen were Jupp Heynckes (500), Carsten Nielsen (1000), Uwe Rahn (1500) and Martin Dahlin (2000).

The first newcomer in the winter break was the free transfer of striker Mike Hanke of Hannover 96. The defence was reinforced with Håvard Nordtveit and Martin Stranzl. On 13 February 2011 Michael Frontzeck was dismissed due to continued failure as a coach. Decisive were defeats against the direct relegation competitors VfB Stuttgart and FC St. Pauli. Lucien Favre was hired as the new head coach. After the team had been in the last place in the table until the 30th match day, they achieved three wins in a row and reached after a 1–1 draw at the last game day 16th place, which allowed one last chance to remain in the league. Borussia competed in two relegation matches against the second league team VfL Bochum and were able to prevent relegation with a 1–0 at home and a 1–1 draw in Bochum.

Under Favre, who took over in January 2011, Borussia Mönchengladbach has in recent years shown ambitions to re-establish themselves in the top regions of the Bundesliga. In the 2010–11 season, after a disastrous first half of the season, Borussia Mönchengladbach managed to narrowly avoid relegation through the post-season relegation play-offs.

The following season, 2011–12, followed this up with a strong season in which they were for much of the year in contention for the championship and eventually finished in fourth place. They missed out on qualification to the 2012–13 UEFA Champions League after losing 4–3 on aggregate to Ukrainian club Dynamo Kyiv in the playoff round. During the 2012–13 Bundesliga season, after losing some key players, notably Marco Reus who was voted player of the year in the Bundesliga in the previous season, Borussia Mönchengladbach still contended for the international places until the last match day, eventually finishing in eighth place.

In the 2013–14 Bundesliga season, they had another very successful year, achieving an excellent third-place after the first half of the season and finishing the season in sixth place, entering them into the 2014–15 Europa League competition at the play-off stage. They finished the 2014–15 Bundesliga season in third place, saving the club a place for direct qualification to the 2015–16 UEFA Champions League group stage. The club found itself in a tough group together with Juventus, Manchester City and Sevilla and although they finished bottom of the group, they claimed a respectable points tally of five, claiming draws home and away against Juventus and defeating eventual Europa League winners Sevilla 4–2 at home.

After a poor start to the 2015–16 Bundesliga season, including five defeats, Favre resigned and was replaced with André Schubert as interim coach. The club's fortunes immediately changed, as it won six-straight Bundesliga matches and eventually finishing the season in fourth position, earning qualification to the Champions League for a second successive season.

In the 2016–17 season, Borussia drew a difficult group in the Champions League, but managed to finish in third place above Celtic and qualify for the UEFA Europa League knockout phase. However, after a promising start in the Bundesliga, the club experienced a poor run of form exacerbated by injuries, and had dropped to the 14th position by the winter break. As a result, André Schubert resigned and was replaced by ex-VfL Wolfsburg manager Dieter Hecking. Hecking began with three wins in four Bundesliga matches as Borussia rose to ninth place and also earned a place in the quarter-finals of the DFB-Pokal.

2017–present: Ascent to the top half of the table
A new record transfer was made by the club for the season. For the German international and world champion Matthias Ginter, the club transferred 17 million euros plus bonus payments to Borussia Dortmund.
In the ninth edition of the Telekom Cup, Borussia had as early as January of the same year again to be content with the fourth and last place after a defeat on penalties against Werder Bremen and against TSG 1899 Hoffenheim. The first round of the DFB Cup 2017–18 was able to make Borussia victorious. The VfL won the West duel against Rot-Weiss Essen 2–1. In the league prelude, the Fohlenelf kept by a goal of Nico Elvedi 1–0 in the Rheinland derby against 1. FC Köln the upper hand and "overwintered" after a final 3–1 home win against Hamburger SV to half-time as sixth with 28 points from eight wins, four draws and five defeats. In the DFB Cup Borussia were eliminated on 20 December 2017 in the last competitive game of the year after a 0–1 defeat in the second round against Bayer 04 Leverkusen in the Borussia-Park at home, after the "Werkself" had already on the 9th matchday of the Bundesliga at the same place won 5–1. The second round match failed; the decisive goal to 1–2 defeat at 1. FC Köln fell in the fifth minute of stoppage time. By contrast, the financial data in the 2017 financial year was more positive. Despite a lack of participation in international competitions, the association posted the second-best result in its history with a turnover of 179.3 million euros and a profit after tax of 6.56 million euros after the record year 2016. The 2017–18 season ended for Borussia after a 1–2 defeat at Hamburger SV left them in ninth place and thus missed, as in the previous year, the qualification for the European competitions. The game was also the last for Hamburg in the highest German league after 55 years of uninterrupted affiliation.

In July 2018, the French striker Alassane Pléa from OGC Nice arrived for the record sum of 23 million euros. In the first round of the 2018–19 DFB-Pokal Mönchengladbach defeated BSC Hastedt 11–1. Thus, Borussia surpassed the previous record, which had been set by the club in an 8–0 victory in the away game at 1. FC Viersen in the first round of the 1977–78 DFB-Pokal.

In the 2019–20 Bundesliga, Mönchengladbach started the season well, and was on top of the league in December 2019, after defeating Bayern Munich 2–1. However, a shaky run of results in the second half of the season meant they ultimately finished in fourth place, 17 points behind champions Bayern. Monchengladbach thus qualified for the UEFA Champions League and were drawn against Inter Milan, Real Madrid, and Shakhtar Donetsk. Borussia achieved their largest win in the Champions League with a 6–0 win over Shakhtar Donetsk, with Alassane Pléa scoring a hat-trick. They advanced to the knockout stage after finishing second place in Group B, but were ultimately knocked out in the round of 16 by Manchester City.

In 2022，Borussia Mönchengladbach struck a strategic partnership with LEYU SPORT.
And LEYU became Official Regional Partner of Borussia Mönchengladbach, which made meaningful progress in Asian market.

Culture
In addition to celebrity fans like Theo Zwanziger, Wolfgang Thierse, Sven Ottke, Kai Ebel, Mickie Krause, Matthias Opdenhövel, Peer Steinbrück and Hannelore Kraft, there are fan clubs in many countries, as far as California, South Africa and New Zealand. A known fan group of the club were "Steinwegs Mamm", who provided the drum in the 1960s for the team, and Ethem Özenrenler, known by his nickname "Manolo" who beat the drum in the northern curve of the Bökelberg Stadium for over 25 years since 1977.

Friendships and rivalries

Friendship with Politehnica Timisoara

Friendship with FSV Mainz 05
After the DFB Cup match against the 1. FSV Mainz 05 on 25 October 1994, a 6–4 win for Mönchengladbach, a fan friendship developed between Mainz and Borussia, which is now maintained by only a few supporters.

Friendship with Liverpool F.C.
On the other hand, there is a long friendship with Liverpool, which comes from the time both teams regularly met in international games. Fans of Borussia travel to Liverpool at regular intervals to watch local Reds games. Conversely, followers from Liverpool still use a visit to Mönchengladbach to symbolise the mutual fan friendship of both clubs. The fans of Mönchengladbach collected 21,000 DM for the families of the 96 dead in the stadium disaster in Sheffield (1989) and presented it to Liverpool FC in 1991 in Mönchengladbach. For the 110th anniversary of the club on 1 August 2010, Liverpool FC were the opponents in a friendly match. The match in front of 51,515 spectators in the Borussia Park Mönchengladbach was won 1–0.

Rivalry with FC Köln
By contrast, there is a strong sporting rivalry between Mönchengladbach and the regional rival 1. FC Köln. Widely considered the most severe of Mönchengladbach's rivalries, the animosities between Mönchengladbach and Cologne had their spark in 1964, when Cologne manager Hennes Weisweiler switched allegiance in favour of Mönchengladbach. Weisweiler is a central figure in both clubs' mythologies; the mascot of Cologne is named Hennes in his honour, whereas Mönchengladbach venerates Weisweiler as the coach of its "team of the century". Mönchengladbach's stadium, Borussia-Park, is furthermore located at a road named Hennes-Weisweiler-Allee in Weisweiler's memory.

This initial outrage on behalf of FC Köln supporters was soon met with a serious sporting rivalry: Although Cologne initially had had the athletic edge as a founding member of the Bundesliga and the league's first champion, Mönchengladbach quickly closed the gap. Between the seasons 1969–70 and 1977–78, Mönchengladbach won five championships, Cologne won one, and FC Bayern Munich secured the remaining three. The 77–78 season has become remembered in both club's collective memories: Although Mönchengladbach defeated Borussia Dortmund in the highest victory in Bundesliga history with a crushing 12–0, Cologne carried the championship with a 5–0 win over FC St. Pauli due to their slightly better goal difference (+45 versus +42 in Cologne's favour). To add insult to injury, Cologne was back under the leadership of Hennes Weisweiler, the personified point of contention between both clubs.

Although neither club has been able to win a Bundesliga title since the 1977–78 season, the rivalry remains, with several incidents of violence between supporters of both clubs. Overall, Mönchengladbach has been more successful in matches between the two, winning 54 out of 105 duels, drawing 20 and losing 31. Notably, Mönchengladbach is more likely to win than FC Köln even in away matches (24–10–17 in Mönchengladbach's favour). The very first iteration of Borussia vs FC Köln was played on 1 January 1961 in front of a crowd of 11,000 in Oberliga West (1947–63). Cologne defeated Mönchengladbach 4–1.

Other rivalries
 FC Bayern Munich: Both Mönchengladbach and Munich had not been starters in the Bundesliga – each won their right to a spot starting with the 1965–66 season. Munich finished 3rd, Mönchengladbach 13th. Both clubs rose to dominance between the 1969–70 and 1976–77 seasons, when five championships went to Mönchengladbach and three to Munich. However, with Mönchengladbach's decline in the 1980s and 1990s, Munich could firmly assert its dominance in both the Bundesliga and in the direct comparisons with Borussia: Out of 118 matches played Munich won 57, Mönchengladbach won 29 and the two clubs drew 32. However, Mönchengladbach has remained a notable wildcard with the ability to inflict painful defeats on Munich, for example when Igor de Camargo scored the decisive goal in the 1–0 victory in the first ever game of goalkeeper Manuel Neuer and defender Jérôme Boateng at Munich on 7 August 2011. Gladbach was also able to escape Munich in 2015 with a 0–2 victory, one of the few victories over Bayern in their home stadium as well as being a rare domestic loss for then-Bayern manager, Pep Guardiola. On October 27, 2021 Gladbach beat Bayern 5–0 in a DFB Pokal (German Cup) match, the worst Bayern loss since 1978 in any competition.
 Borussia Dortmund: While not nearly as pronounced as Dortmund's rivalry against FC Schalke 04 or Mönchengladbach's own struggle against 1. FC Köln, Dortmund and Mönchengladbach still occasionally lock horns, mostly because of the naming similarity – both are the two Borussias of the Bundesliga. The song Es gibt nur eine Borussia ('there is only one Borussia') is popular among Mönchengladbach supporters when facing Dortmund squads. The duel between the two has been dubbed the Borussengipfel, the Borussia Summit, in the media.

Songs
The official club anthem is the song The Eleven of the Lower Rhine, which is sung before every home game. The song was recorded by the group BO, the band of the fan project. Next to them are the songs We are Borussia and The soul burns a permanent place in the fan scene. The anthem by Gerry & the Pacemakers, "You'll Never Walk Alone", which is sung by numerous clubs around Europe is frequently heard.

The goal song, which is heard after every home game, is the refrain of Scooter's "Maria (I Like It Loud)". It is accompanied by the sonorous announcement "Tor für die Borussia", by Rolf Göttel, who worked as honorary announcer of Borussia in Bökelbergstadion for decades.

Mascot
A first mascot was created by manager Helmut Grasshoff and was called Bumsi. The head was a Telstar- style ball with eyes and black, curly hair. The official mascot of the club since the season opener in 1998, is the foal Jünter, whose name refers to the Mönchengladbach native and longtime Borussia player Günter Netzer.

Sponsors

Kit manufacturers

Players and staff

Squad

On loan

Women's team

Squad

Retired numbers
 12 – the 12th man, dedicated to fans

Coaching and backroom staff
Staff for the 2022–23 season:

History of head coaches

UEFA club rankings

Honours
Borussia Mönchengladbach's five Bundesliga championships entitle the club to display two gold stars of the "Verdiente Meistervereine".

Domestic
Bundesliga:
 Winners: 1969–70, 1970–71, 1974–75, 1975–76, 1976–77
 Runners-up: 1973–74, 1977–78

2. Bundesliga:
 Winners: 2007–08

DFB-Pokal:
 Winners: 1959–60, 1972–73, 1994–95
 Runners-up: 1983–84, 1991–92

German Supercup:
 (Unofficial winners): 1977

European
European Cup:
 Runners-up: 1976–77

UEFA Cup:
 Winners: 1974–75, 1978–79
 Runners-up: 1972–73, 1979–80

International
Intercontinental Cup:
 Runners-up: 1977

Youth
German Under 17 Champions:
 Winners: 1981

Under 17 Bundesliga West
 Winners: 2009

Double
1974–75: League and UEFA Cup

Records and statistics

Most appearances
Only for Bundesliga

Top scorers

Players' honours
For a list of every Borussia Mönchengladbach player with 100 or more appearances, see List of Borussia Mönchengladbach players

Players of the club achieved the following honours:

 Ballon d'Or
 1977:  Allan Simonsen

 Player of the Year – Germany
 1971:  Berti Vogts
 1972:  Günter Netzer
 1973:  Günter Netzer
 1979:  Berti Vogts
 1987:  Uwe Rahn
 2012:  Marco Reus

 Player of the Year – Australia
 1996:  Damian Mori

 Player of the Year – Austria
 1986:  Anton Polster
 1997:  Anton Polster

 Player of the Year – Belgium
 2001:  Wesley Sonck

 Player of the Year – Denmark
 1994:  Thomas Helveg

 Player of the Year – Sweden
 1993:  Martin Dahlin
 1995:  Patrik Andersson
 2001:  Patrik Andersson

 Player of the Year – United States
 1997:  Kasey Keller
 1999:  Kasey Keller
 2005:  Kasey Keller

 Bundesliga Top Scorers
 1974 – 30 Goals –  Jupp Heynckes (jointly with Gerd Müller (Bayern Munich))
 1975 – 29 Goals –  Jupp Heynckes
 1987 – 24 Goals –  Uwe Rahn
 1995 – 20 Goals –  Heiko Herrlich (jointly with Mario Basler (Werder Bremen))

 Goal of the Year
 1971:  Ulrik Le Fevre
 1972:  Günter Netzer
 1973:  Günter Netzer
 1978:  Rainer Bonhof
 1979:  Harald Nickel
 2005:  Kasper Bögelund
 2006:  Oliver Neuville

 Goal of the Season
 2012–13:  Juan Arango
 2020–21:  Valentino Lazaro

References

Literature

External links

Borussia-Park the team's new stadium (archived 24 April 2006)
Tactics and Line-ups
Moenchengladbach statistics
FohlenKommando
Torfabrik
Fussballreport (archived 16 January 2013)

 
Football clubs in Germany
Association football clubs established in 1900
Football clubs in North Rhine-Westphalia
1900 establishments in Germany
UEFA Cup winning clubs
Bundesliga clubs
Mönchengladbach
2. Bundesliga clubs